The Free State pygmy mouse or Orange mouse (Mus orangiae) is a species of rodent in the family Muridae.
It is found in Lesotho and South Africa.
Its natural habitats are subtropical or tropical high-altitude grassland, arable land, and pastureland.

References

Mus (rodent)
Mammals of South Africa
Mammals described in 1926
Taxonomy articles created by Polbot
Taxobox binomials not recognized by IUCN